Tyra Lynne Banks (born December 4, 1973), also known as BanX, is an American television personality, model, producer, writer, and actress. Born in Inglewood, California, she began her career as a model at the age of 15 and was the first African-American woman to be featured on the covers of GQ and the Sports Illustrated Swimsuit Issue, on which she appeared three times. She was a Victoria's Secret Angel from 1997 to 2005. By the early 2000s, Banks was one of the world's top-earning models.

Banks began acting on television in the sitcom The Fresh Prince of Bel-Air (1993) and made her film debut in the drama Higher Learning (1995). In 2000, she had major film roles, such as Eve in Disney Channel's Life-Size and Zoe in the box-office hit Coyote Ugly. Banks had small roles in the romantic sports film Love & Basketball (2000), the horror film Halloween: Resurrection (2002), and in the television series Gossip Girl (2009) and Glee (2013).

In 2003, Banks created the long-running reality television series America's Next Top Model, which she executive produced and presented for the first twenty-two seasons, until the series' cancellation in October 2015. She remained executive producer for the revival of the series in 2016 and enlisted Rita Ora as host for the twenty-third cycle before reassuming the duties herself for the twenty-fourth cycle. Banks was the co-creator of True Beauty (2009–2010), and had her own television talk show, The Tyra Banks Show (2005–2010), which aired on The CW and won two Daytime Emmy awards for Outstanding Talk Show Informative. In 2015, she co-hosted the talk show FABLife for two months. In 2017, Banks was the host of America's Got Talent for its 12th season. In 2020, she was the host of Dancing with the Stars for its 29th season, also serving as an executive producer.

In 2010, Banks published a young adult novel titled Modelland, based on her life as a model, which topped The New York Times Best Seller list in 2011. She also has her own production company, Bankable Productions, which produced The Tyra Banks Show, America's Next Top Model, and the 2008 film The Clique. Banks is one of four African Americans and seven women to have repeatedly been ranked among the world's most influential people by Time magazine. She is also one of only seventeen models to be ranked as a Legendary Supermodel by MODELS.com.

Early life and education
Tyra Lynne Banks was born in Inglewood, California, on December 4, 1973. Her mother, Carolyn London (now London-Johnson), is a medical photographer, and her father, Donald Banks, is a computer consultant. She has a brother, Devin, who is five years older. In 1979, when Banks was six years old, her parents divorced. Banks attended John Burroughs Middle School and graduated in 1991 from Immaculate Heart High School in Los Angeles. Banks has said that while growing up, she was teased for her appearance and considered an "ugly duckling"; when Banks was 11 years old, she grew three inches and lost 30 pounds in three months. On America's Next Top Model, Banks discussed the results of an Ancestry.com genealogical DNA test that gave her "79% African, 14% British, and 6% Native American" results. In an interview, she added that she is also "1% Finnish", saying: "I'm 14% British, 6% Native American, 1% Finnish, and all the rest African."
In February 2012, Banks completed a nine-week course at Harvard University's Owner/President Management non-degree extension program.

Modeling career

When Banks was 15 years old, she started modeling while attending school in Los Angeles. She was rejected by four modeling agencies before she was signed by L.A. Models. She switched to Elite Model Management at age 16. When she got the opportunity to model in Europe, she moved to Milan. In her first runway season, she booked 25 shows in the 1991 Paris Fashion Week. Banks appeared in editorials for American, Italian, French, and Spanish Vogue; American, French, German, and Spanish Elle; American, German, and Malaysian Harper's Bazaar; V; W and Vanity Fair.

She appeared on the covers of magazines such as Elle; Harper's Bazaar; Spanish Vogue; Cosmopolitan; Seventeen and Teen Vogue. She walked in fashion shows for Chanel, Oscar de la Renta, Yves Saint Laurent, Anna Sui, Christian Dior, Donna Karan, Calvin Klein, Perry Ellis, Marc Jacobs, Givenchy, Herve Leger, Valentino, Fendi, Isaac Mizrahi, Giorgio Armani, Sonia Rykiel, Michael Kors and others. She appeared in advertising campaigns for Yves Saint Laurent, Dolce & Gabbana, Escada, Tommy Hilfiger, Ralph Lauren, Halston, H&M, XOXO, Swatch, Versace, Christian Lacroix, Victoria's Secret, Got Milk?, Pepsi and Nike. In 1993, Banks signed a contract with CoverGirl cosmetics, launching advertising campaigns for the cosmetics company. She was one of only a few Black models to achieve Supermodel status. In the mid-1990s, Banks returned to America to do more commercial modeling.

Banks was the first Black woman on the cover of Sports Illustrated Swimsuit Issue and the first African-American woman on the cover of GQ. In 1997, she received the VH1 award for "Supermodel of the Year". That year, she was the first African American chosen for the cover of the Victoria's Secret catalog, and became a Victoria's Secret Angel. In 2010, Banks re-signed with her former modeling agency IMG Models. Banks is now a contributor of the Vogue Italia website. In 2013, Banks transformed herself into 15 supermodels, in collaboration with fashion photographer Udo Spreitzenbarth.

In 2019, Banks came out of her modeling retirement to pose for one of the three 2019 Sports Illustrated Swimsuit Issue covers; the other cover models being Camille Kostek and Alex Morgan. It marked her third cover for the publication, 22 years after her first. She also announced that she will now go by the modeling name BanX.

Television and film career

Banks's television career began on the fourth season of The Fresh Prince of Bel-Air, in which she played lead character Will Smith's old friend Jackie Ames. She made seven appearances in the series. Other TV credits include Felicity, All That, MADtv, Nick Cannon's Wild 'n Out (in which she was featured as a special guest host and team captain) and The Price Is Right (guest-starring as a "Barker's Beauty"). She also appeared as a guest in the animated talk show Space Ghost Coast to Coast in an episode entitled "Chinatown".

Banks started her production company, "Ty Ty Baby Productions" — soon afterward changed to Bankable Productions — which produced The Tyra Banks Show, America's Next Top Model and the 2008 movie The Clique. 
Banks is the executive producer and former presenter and judge of America's Next Top Model. In addition, she hosted The Tyra Banks Show, a daytime talk show aimed at younger women, which premiered on September 12, 2005, and ran until May 28, 2010. 
In 2008, Banks won the Daytime Emmy Award for her work and production on The Tyra Banks Show, and won for the second time in a row for outstanding, informative talkshow in 2009.

Banks's first big screen role came in 1994, when she co-starred in the drama Higher Learning. She then co-starred with Lindsay Lohan in the Disney film Life-Size, playing a doll named Eve who comes to life. Other films she has starred in include Love Stinks (1999), Love & Basketball (2000), Coyote Ugly (2000), Halloween: Resurrection (2002) and Hannah Montana: The Movie (2009).
Banks appeared in the fourth episode of the third season of Gossip Girl playing Ursula Nyquist, a larger-than-life actress. She also appeared on the Disney Channel show Shake It Up as a school librarian.

In 2012, Deadline Hollywood reported that Banks would co-create and produce an ABC comedy series based on her teenage years titled Fivehead. In 2015, Banks starred in the round table lineup talk show FABLife alongside model Chrissy Teigen, fashion stylist Joe Zee, interior designer Lauren Makk, and YouTube personality Leah Ashley. Banks quit the series after less than three months to focus on her cosmetics company. In 2018, Banks returned to acting for her starring role in Life-Size 2, which premiered on Freeform on December 2. Banks will also star and executive produce Beauty, a documentary series for Quibi. In 2018, she signed a deal with Universal Television.

In July 2020, it was announced that Banks would be the new host of Dancing with the Stars. In August 2020, Banks signed a deal with ABC Signature. In March 2023, Banks decided to leave the show after 3 seasons to focus on buisness commintements.

Other ventures

Cosmetics
In 2014, Banks founded the cosmetics brand Tyra Beauty, which she completed a non-degree certificate program at Harvard Business School specifically for. Tyra Beauty uses a multi-level marketing system to recruit sales distributors, who are called "beautytainers" by the company. Banks held a casting call to find faces for her line, eventually selecting Melody Parra, Monique Hayward, Katy Harvey and Top Model Norge contestant Marita Gomsrud as the cosmetic line's original beauty models.
In March 2011, Banks launched her fashion and beauty website called "typeF.com", which she co-created with Demand Media. In 2015, she launched "tyra.com", an interactive cosmetic e-commerce site.

Music
Banks has appeared in several music videos, including Michael Jackson's "Black or White", Mobb Deep's "Trife Life", Tina Turner's "Love Thing", George Michael's "Too Funky" (with models Linda Evangelista, Estelle Lefébure, Emma Sjoberg and Nadja Auermann) and Lionel Richie's "Don't Wanna Lose You". In 2004, she recorded her first single, "Shake Ya Body", which had a music video featuring contestants from cycle 2 of America's Next Top Model. The video premiered on UPN.
Banks released a single with NBA player Kobe Bryant, entitled "K.O.B.E.", which was performed on NBA TV. She also had a single on the Life-Size (2000) soundtrack called "Be a Star".  Banks recorded a song with musician Todrick Hall for his 2021 album Femuline, entitled "Fashón".

Writing
In 1998, Banks co-authored a book entitled Tyra's Beauty, Inside and Out. She announced in May 2010 that she would be writing a novel, titled Modelland, loosely based on her own modelling experience.  It was published in September 2011, intended to be the first of a planned three-part series; Modelland topped The New York Times Best Seller list in October 2011. In 2018, Banks and her mother, Carolyn London, co-authored a book entitled "Perfect is Boring".

Teaching
In August 2016, Banks accepted a position as a personal branding guest lecturer at Stanford University.

Personal life

Banks dated Norwegian photographer Erik Asla during the 2010s, and in January 2016 they had a biological son born via surrogacy. Banks has stated that she tends to avoid drinking and has never used other recreational drugs.

Banks has spoken out about abusive relationships in her past. In 2005, when asked about her relationship history, she stated, "I won't be using a lot of names on the show, but a specific relationship had not just cheating but emotional abuse. It was really bad, but that made me strong." In 2009, she opened up about her past relationships when she made a guest appearance on The Oprah Winfrey Show, hosting alongside Oprah Winfrey. The episode was dedicated to dating violence in response to the assault of Rihanna by Chris Brown.

Education

In 2011, Banks enrolled in the nine-week Owner/President Management Program (OPM) at Harvard Business School. Banks completed the executive education training program in February 2012, earning a certificate. She has come under criticism for implying she is a Harvard graduate. Jenna Sauers, writing for Jezebel, referred to her statements on Harvard as "disingenuous", and called upon her to "stop lying" about Harvard. As of 2012, Harvard professor Rohit Deshpande was preparing a case study on Banks's company, Bankable Productions, for use in future coursework in the OPM program.

Philanthropy
Banks established the TZONE program, which aimed at leadership and life skills development. She has also established the Tyra Banks Scholarship, a fund aimed at providing African-American girls the opportunity to attend her alma mater, Immaculate Heart High School. In 2005, TZONE transformed from a camp into a public charity, the Tyra Banks TZONE.

Filmography

Film

Television

Music videos

Bibliography

Awards and nominations

References

External links

The Tyra Banks Show website
The New York Times Profile/Interview

1973 births
Living people
20th-century American actresses
21st-century American actresses
21st-century American women singers
Activists from California
Actresses from Los Angeles
African-American actresses
African-American businesspeople
African-American Christians
African-American female models
African-American game show hosts
African-American models
African-American television personalities
African-American television talk show hosts
African-American women in business
African-American women singers
American businesspeople in retailing
American cosmetics businesspeople
American female models
American film actresses
American game show hosts
American people of British descent
American philanthropists
American television actresses
American television talk show hosts
American women television producers
Alumni of Immaculate Heart High School, Los Angeles
Businesspeople from Los Angeles
Daytime Emmy Award winners
Female models from California
American LGBT rights activists
People from Inglewood, California
Singers from Los Angeles
Television personalities from California
Television producers from California
Victoria's Secret Angels
Women civil rights activists